The Naval War College Museum in Newport, Rhode Island, is one of 10 official American museums operated by the United States Navy, under the direction of the Naval History & Heritage Command and in co-operation with the Naval War College. It is located at Building 10, Luce Avenue, Naval Station Newport.  It is located in the building which first housed the Naval War College, a structure built in the early 19th century to house Newport's poor.  The building is a contributing element to a National Historic Landmark District, along with Luce Hall, the college's first purpose-built building, in recognition of the War College's historical significance.

History
The Naval War College established the Naval Museum in 1952, with the approval of the Chief of Naval Operations to manage its collections of historical artifacts. Since 1978, it has occupied its present quarters on Coasters Harbor Island in Narragansett Bay. This building, now called Founders Hall, was originally built in 1819 as the Newport Poor Asylum. The city of Newport and the state of Rhode Island donated this property to the Navy for use as the Naval War College. The college's first president, Rear Admiral Stephen B. Luce, formally dedicated the building to the Navy's use. The building became famous in the years 1886–1889, when the college's second president, Captain Alfred Thayer Mahan, first gave his lectures in this building that formed the basis for his famous book The Influence of Sea Power Upon History, 1660-1783 (1890).

Founders Hall and Luce Hall were designated a National Historic Landmark District in 1964, and listed on the National Register of Historic Places in 1966.

Museum
Today, the Naval War College Museum uses this building to display exhibits on three themes: (a) the history of the Naval War College since 1884; (b) the history of naval activities in the Narragansett Bay area since the colonial period; and (3) the history of the art and science of naval warfare since ancient times.

See also

List of maritime museums in the United States

References

External links
Naval War College Museum official website

1952 establishments in Rhode Island
University and college buildings on the National Register of Historic Places in Rhode Island
Infrastructure completed in 1884
Landmarks in Rhode Island
Maritime museums in Rhode Island
Military and war museums in Rhode Island
Museums established in 1952
Museums in Newport, Rhode Island
National Historic Landmarks in Rhode Island
Naval War College
United States Navy museums
University museums in Rhode Island
Naval History and Heritage Command
National Register of Historic Places in Newport, Rhode Island
Historic district contributing properties in Rhode Island